Tribute is a 1980 Canadian comedy-drama film directed by Bob Clark and starring Jack Lemmon as Scottie Templeton, a terminally ill Broadway agent trying to make amends with his family and friends. Robby Benson and Lee Remick co-star, with supporting roles Colleen Dewhurst, John Marley, Kim Cattrall, and Gale Garnett. It is based on the play of the same name by Bernard Slade, who also wrote the screenplay.

The film was released in December 1980 to widespread critical acclaim. It was entered into the 31st Berlin International Film Festival where Jack Lemmon won the Silver Bear for Best Actor, and Clark was nominated for the Golden Bear. Lemmon was also nominated for an Academy Award and a Golden Globe for his performance, and won the Genie Award for Best Performance by a Foreign Actor. The film was nominated for ten other Genies, including Best Picture, Best Direction, Best Adapted Screenplay, and Best Score.

Plot
Scottie Templeton is a show-business veteran, based in New York and well known in the theatrical community there. He has many acquaintances, but is divorced from his wife and estranged from his only son.

Scottie learns that he has leukemia and is dying. His ex-wife Maggie, in town for a school reunion, comes to visit and reflect on their time together. Scottie makes an effort to reconnect with his son, Jud, who still has anger issues. A young model whom Scottie met in the hospital, Sally Haines, strikes Scottie as someone who might be a good romantic match for his son. As a testimonial dinner is organized in Scottie's honor, he attempts to repair some of his past relationships in the time he has left.

Cast
 Jack Lemmon - Scottie Templeton
 Robby Benson - Jud Templeton
 Lee Remick - Maggie Stratton
 Colleen Dewhurst - Gladys Petrelli
 John Marley - Lou Daniels
 Kim Cattrall - Sally Haines
 Gale Garnett - Hilary
 Teri Keane - Evelyn
 Rummy Bishop - Poker Player
 John Dee - Poker Player
 Bob Windsor - Poker Player
 Eileen Lehman - Nurse
 Andrew Foot - Actor
 Trevor Daley - Cop

Awards
It was entered into the 31st Berlin International Film Festival, where Jack Lemmon won the Silver Bear for Best Actor. Lemmon was also nominated for a Golden Globe and an Academy Award for his performance. He won the Canadian Genie Award for Best Performance by a Foreign Actor.

References

External links

1980 films
1980 comedy-drama films
20th Century Fox films
Canadian comedy-drama films
English-language Canadian films
1980s English-language films
Films about father–son relationships
Films about cancer
Films based on Canadian plays
Films directed by Bob Clark
Films set in New York City
Films shot in New York City
1980 comedy films
1980 drama films
1980s Canadian films